KCSC may refer to:

 Kalpetta Common Service Center, north kerala wayanad based common Service center in india
 Korea Communications Standards Commission, South Korea's Broadcasting and Internet communications review agency
 KCSC-FM, a radio station (95.9 FM) licensed to serve Woodward, Oklahoma, United States
 KCSC-LP, a low-power radio station (101.9 FM) licensed to serve Mukilteo, Washington, United States
 Kansas Cosmosphere and Space Center